Heveningham was the name of a prominent Norfolk family. Notable people with the surname include:

Mary Heveningham, mistress of Henry VIII during his marriage to her cousin, Anne Boleyn. 
William Heveningham (1604-1678), Roundhead politician.

See also
Heveningham